Yavin (also known as "Yavin Prime", to distinguish it from its moons) is a fictional planet in the Star Wars galaxy. It first appeared in the 1977 film Star Wars and is depicted as a large red gas giant with an extensive satellite system of moons. The hidden military base of the Rebel Alliance is located on its fourth moon, Yavin 4.

The climactic space battle at the end of the film, in which the Rebel Alliance destroys the Death Star, takes place in orbit around the planet Yavin. In Star Wars fandom and the Star Wars Expanded Universe, this event is especially significant as it is one method used to mark an epoch in the fictional Star Wars universe. Events in the Star Wars Legends continuity are typically dated in terms of years BBY ("Before the Battle of Yavin") or ABY ("After the Battle of Yavin").

Depiction

In early drafts of the Star Wars story, author George Lucas began inventing names of characters and planets and assigning roles and characteristics. In The Star Wars (1973), Yavin is described as a jungle planet inhabited by eight-foot-tall Wookiees. (This concept was eventually altered, although the setting of a Wookiee home planet re-emerged later as the planet Kashyyyk, as seen in the 2005 film Star Wars: Episode III – Revenge of the Sith.)

In Lucas's 1975 second draft, The Adventures of the Starkiller Episode I: The Star Wars, the story's heroes land on Yavin in escape pods and are attacked by insect creatures. They find the Rebel Massassi Outpost and meet characters such as Bail Antilles and General Dodonna, and the Rebel commander is the Grand Moff Tarkin. It is here that Luke Skywalker ends his quest by being reunited with his aged father. In later revisions of the story, Tarkin becomes an Imperial officer and Luke's father is removed from the action—he later re-emerges in The Empire Strikes Back (1980) as the hidden identity of the main antagonist, Darth Vader. In the fourth draft (1976), Lucas added a scene in which Luke is also reunited on Yavin with his childhood friend, Biggs Darklighter, a scene which was actually shot but subsequently deleted from the final cut of the original Star Wars film. The scene was re-inserted in the 1997 Star Wars Trilogy Special Edition. The closing scene of a victorious award ceremony appears in early drafts, but it is originally set on a gaseous cloud planet called Ophuchi.

According to Lucasfilm's Star Wars Story Group executive Leland Chee, "Yavin 4" ("Yavin Four" in dialogue) is the correct spelling, not "Yavin IV".

Film
The planet Yavin made its first appearance in the original 1977 Star Wars film. The planet is shown in space during the approach of the Millennium Falcon spaceship as a large red gas giant planet; orbiting this planet, Yavin 4, the fourth moon, appears on screen as a green/blue-colored Earth-like world. Scenes showing the Rebel Base are all set on this Moon, which is covered in dense, mist-covered jungles. The Rebel Alliance has established its base hidden in a complex of ancient temple ruins, known as the Massassi ruins. Tall observation towers stand above the treetops to monitor entries and exits from the base. Once discovered by the Galactic Empire, the Yavin Base is threatened by the Death Star, the Empire's giant space station which has the capability of destroying entire planets. The Rebellion launches an attack on the Death Star with X-wing and Y-wing starfighters; with seconds remaining before the Yavin moon is to be destroyed, Luke Skywalker launches proton torpedoes and successfully destroys the Death Star. The film concludes with a triumphant award ceremony on Yavin in which the heroes are decorated for their bravery.

This battle has become known as the Battle of Yavin, and its date is used as a place-marker for events in the expanded Star Wars universe. Events before the Battle of Yavin are marked by BBY ("Before the Battle of Yavin"), and events that occur after are marked by ABY ("After the Battle of Yavin").

After the events of Episode IV: A New Hope, the Rebellion abandons the moon to seek sanctuary elsewhere. However, Yavin base features once again in the 2016 standalone film, Rogue One. Set a short time before Episode IV, Rogue One follows the story of a young outlaw called Jyn Erso who becomes involved with the Rebels. Erso is brought to the base on Yavin 4 and several scenes in the base depict characters who originally appeared in earlier Star Wars films, including Senator Mon Mothma, Bail Organa and General Dodonna. Erso argues with the Rebel leadership on Yavin 4 about a planned attack on an Imperial base to steal the schematics of the Death Star. Defying their decision against the operation, Erso joins a task force to steal the Death Star plans, thus setting in motion the events that lead up to Episode IV.

Filming locations

As with other fictional Star Wars settings, several real-world filming locations have been used to create the Yavin Moon location. For the original 1977 film, Guatemala was chosen for second unit filming to create establishing shots for the Yavin base, and in March 1977, a crew led by Richard Edlund travelled to Guatemala. The exterior panoramic shots featuring the scenery of Yavin 4 were filmed overlooking the ancient Mayan pyramid complex of Tikal amid a dense rainforest. The Rebel outlook post was built from trash cans glued together and mounted on a pole; the special effects artist Lorne Peterson was persuaded to climb into the precarious structure to pose in Rebel uniform for the shot.

The Rebel hangar scenes were shot inside a pair of disused WWII airship sheds at RAF Cardington in England. Shed 1 served as the Rebel hangar in Episode IV. The exterior of the hangar entrance was shot at Cardington through a matte painting of a temple structure. When film crews returned to Cardington in 2015 to shoot Rogue One, they used Shed 2.

Other media
Yavin 4 was frequently featured in the Star Wars Expanded Universe. Following the 2012 acquisition of Lucasfilm by The Walt Disney Company, in April 2014, most of the licensed Star Wars novels and comics produced since the originating 1977 film were rebranded as Star Wars Legends and declared non-canon to the franchise.

Yavin 4 is featured in the 2015 comic book miniseries Star Wars: Shattered Empire as the home of Shara Bey and Kes Dameron, the parents of Poe Dameron. Oscar Isaac, who portrays Dameron in the Star Wars sequel trilogy, specifically requested that Yavin 4 be his character's home world after learning that scenes set on the moon were filmed in his home country, Guatemala.

Legends

In issues of the Star Wars newspaper comic strip written by Archie Goodwin published between 1981 and 1983, the Rebels remain stationed for a time on Yavin 4 while it is being blockaded by the Empire. Similarly, in the Star Wars Kids comics published between 1997 and 1998, the Rebels remain on Yavin 4 until their base is infiltrated by a spy.

In Legends continuity, the giant temples on the Yavin 4 moon are said to have been built ages ago by the Massassi to worship Naga Sadow, a Sith Lord who had enslaved and mutated the Massassi using Sith Alchemy. In the comic book series Tales of the Jedi, it is stated that Yavin 4 was where Naga Sadow hid from the Republic in 5,000 BBY and was discovered several hundred years later by the fallen Jedi Freedon Nadd. According to the comic series, the Massassi warriors who built the ruins used by the Rebels were brought to the planet by the Sith Order in its early years.

In the 1994 Jedi Academy trilogy of novels, Kevin J. Anderson suggests that Jedi Knight Exar Kun had the temples built. Enveloped in the dark side, Kun elevated himself to the stature of a god. He enslaved the Massassi and forced them to construct an intricate complex of massive temples that were used for arcane Sith ceremonies and rites as focus for the dark side. In the same series, Yavin 4 is the base of Jedi Master Luke Skywalker's Jedi Praxeum, where he personally trains the next generation of Jedi Knights. Once Skywalker has trained enough Jedi, this duty is taken up by the married Jedi Masters, Battlemaster Kam Solusar and his wife Chief Librarian Tionne Solusar, as well as another former apprentice of Skywalker's, Streen. The Praxeum is destroyed by the Yuuzhan Vong during their invasion of the moon in 26 ABY. The Praxeum is eventually relocated to the ancient Jedi homeworld, Ossus. The original Praxeum is the main setting of the Young Jedi Knights series, based on Skywalker's teenage niece and nephew, Jaina and Jacen Solo.

In the young reader novel The Lost City of the Jedi (1992), it is discovered, as the title suggests, that the ancient Jedi built a lost city on Yavin 4.

In the animated micro-series Star Wars: Clone Wars (2003), Yavin 4 is the site of a duel between Anakin Skywalker and Asajj Ventress, a follower of Count Dooku. Anakin defeats Asajj, sending her falling down a dark abyss.

In Star Wars video games, Yavin 4 appears in the downloadable content for the video game Star Wars: Knights of the Old Republic. Yavin 4 has also been added in the latest expansion (December 2014) of the MMORPG Star Wars: The Old Republic. Titled "Shadow of Revan", the expansion establishes a connection with the previous game.

The Super Star Destroyer Knight Hammer is destroyed here when it was diverted towards the planet's core after a collision with a Rebel vessel. 

The Junior Jedi Knights series features a second inhabited moon, Yavin 8, and mentions a third, Yavin 13. Yavin 8 is home to a mermaid like species, the melodies, and their various predators. Yavin 13 is shared by the rabbit-like Gerb species and the serpentine Slith. The fates of the two moons and their people are unclear after the Yuuzhan Vong invasion in The New Jedi Order series, with there being contradictory sources about whether the moons were wiped clean of all life or the invaders merely targeted any Force users on them.

See also
 List of Star Wars planets and moons

References 
Footnotes

Citations

Sources

External links 

 
 
 

Star Wars planets
Fictional giant planets
Fictional elements introduced in 1977